The Spider was an American pulp magazine that was published from 1933 to 1943. It included a lead novel in every issue that featured The Spider, a heroic crimefighter. It was published by Popular Publications, as a rival to Street & Smith's The Shadow and Standard Magazine's The Phantom Detective.  Many of the stories involved science fiction plot devices, such as a metal-eating virus, or giant robots.

The magazine was cancelled in 1943, because of the shortage of paper caused by World War II.  The last issue was dated December 1943.

Bibliographic details 

The Spider was published by Popular Publications, and produced 118 issues between October 1933 and December 1943. It was pulp format for all issues; it began at 128 pages and was reduced to 112 pages after March 1936.  The price was 10 cents throughout its run. The volume numbering was entirely regular, with four issues per volume; the last issue was volume 30 number 2. It was monthly from the first issue until March 1943; the four remaining issues were dated June, August, October and December 1943.

References

Sources 

 
 

Magazines established in 1933
Magazines disestablished in 1943
Pulp magazines